Garth Gant Hallquist Gerhart (born October 21, 1988) is an American football center. He attended Arizona State University from 2007 to 2011.

Professional career 
Gerhart was signed by the Cleveland Browns after going undrafted in the 2012 NFL Draft before signing with the Packers on January 8, 2013. He was released from the Packers on August 31, 2013. He was signed to the Carolina Panthers' practice squad for the beginning of the 2013 season before shortly being released. Gerhart was signed to the Green Bay Packers' practice squad on October 10, 2013. He was later signed to the active roster before Week 1 of the 2014 season. On January 5, 2016, Gerhart signed a reserve/futures contract with the Cleveland Browns. On September 3, 2016, he was released by the Browns.

Personal life 
A native of Norco, California, Gerhart was considered a three-star recruit by Rivals.com. Garth Gerhart is the younger brother of 2009 Heisman Trophy runner-up Toby Gerhart. His father, Todd, also played football.

References

External links
NFL Combine bio
Arizona State Sun Devils bio

1988 births
Living people
Players of American football from California
American football centers
Arizona State Sun Devils football players
Sportspeople from Corona, California
People from Norco, California
Cleveland Browns players
Carolina Panthers players
Green Bay Packers players